Ella Eronen (29 January 1900 — 9 October 1987) was a Finnish actor and poetic reciter, and one of the country's leading actresses of the 20th century, especially of the 1930s through to 1950s. She was variously known as Diiva ('The Diva'), La Ella and Ella Suuri ('Ella the Great'). The noted Finnish theatre and film critic Jukka Kajava called her "possibly Finland's most legendary theatre actor".

Early life and education
Ella Siviä Eronen was born in Helsinki to police detective August Eronen and Amanda  Ahlgren, as one of the couple's five children and the eldest of three daughters.

The Eronen family was bilingual (Finnish from the father's side, Swedish from the mother's), and Ella was educated in both languages.

She first began learning acting at the Swedish Theatre in Helsinki in 1915, initially in the dance corps, but as she already had some acting experience she did not take well to formal training, and in the end was largely self-learned. Eronen's interest in acting and dance was encouraged by her mother, while her father was against it; her mother's death in 1916 put paid to her aspirations, until a couple of years later when she moved to Stockholm to continue her studies at the drama school of Sweden's royal national theatre 'Dramaten'. In addition to acting and dance, Eronen also received tuition in singing.

Career

Stage work (selected)
Eronen's stage debut came already at the age of six, when she performed the role of the young Mats in Strindberg's  at the Swedish Theatre. A few years later she made her dance debut at the Finnish National Theatre in the ballet Les Sylphides.

Eronen was attached to several leading theatre companies during her career, including the Swedish Theatres of Helsinki and Turku, as well as the National Theatre for over two decades. Although her repertoire was wide and varied, she remains particularly remembered as a tragedienne; of the over 300  roles she played, some of the more notable ones included:

Lady Macbeth in Macbeth —  Åbo Svenska Teater (1936); reprised at the National Theatre (1938, 1964)
Cleopatra in Antony and Cleopatra — National Theatre (1944)
Alice in The Dance of Death — National Theatre (1947)
Blanche du Bois in A Streetcar Named Desire — National Theatre (1950)
Lavinia in Mourning Becomes Electra — Tampere Theatre (1952)
Phèdre in Phèdre — National Theatre (1959)

Recitals
Outside of the world of theatre, Eronen performed many poetry recitals, in particular works of Eino Leino and excerpts from the Finnish national epic, Kalevala.

In February 1940, as Finland was in the midst of the Winter War against the Soviet Union, she notably recited the lyrics of the Finnish national anthem, Maamme (Swedish: Vårt land), in both Swedish and Finnish at the Stockholm Olympic Stadium, which helped to raise funds and support for Finland's war effort among the Swedish population, rally Finland's morale, as well as giving a significant boost to Eronen's own reputation. (A 1957 recording of her recital is available online.) The recital was broadcast on public radio in both Sweden and Finland, and as a result Eronen became popularly known as the 'Voice of Finland'.

Filmography
Despite her varied and long acting career, Eronen appeared in only a relatively few films:
Jääkärin morsian (1931) — Sonja Strand
Pikku myyjätär (1933) — a customer
Herrat täysihoidossa (1933) — Varpu Kyyhkynen
Elinan surma (1938) — Kirsti Fleming
Laitakaupungin laulu (1948) — Juudit, pub landlady

Later in her career she also appeared in several television series and dramas.

Award and honours

In 1977, the honorary title of Professori was conferred on Eronen.

Personal life
Eronen was married three times: first to Swedish actor Per Eugen Andersson (1919-24), then to sculptor  ( Karl Svensson; 1928-35), and finally to portrait painter Eino Olavi Tarkkonen (1937-61); the first, unhappy marriage ended in the death of her husband from alcoholism, the latter two in divorce.

She had two children: a daughter from her marriage to Wilhelms, and a son with Tarkkonen.

Despite her fame and reputation as a diva, Eronen was a private person, with only a small, trusted circle of close friends and relatives. She went to great efforts to manage her public image.

Eronen suffered from ill health in her final years, including in the autumn of 1987 a major stroke, which took away her ability to speak, and she died shortly afterwards. She is buried in the artists' section of the Hietaniemi Cemetery of Helsinki.

References

Further reading
Ella Eronen in the National Biography of Finland

External links

20th-century Finnish actresses
Actors from Helsinki
Pro Finlandia Medals of the Order of the Lion of Finland
1900 births
1987 deaths